Dubai Aerospace Enterprise Ltd (DAE) is a global aviation services company and one of the largest aircraft leasing companies in the world. Headquartered in Dubai and with over 30 years in business, DAE's leasing and engineering divisions serve over 110 airline customers around the world from its seven locations in Dubai, Dublin, Singapore, New York, Miami, Seattle and Amman.

DAE Engineering
Located at the Queen Alia International Airport in Amman-Jordan, DAE's engineering division, Joramco has a facility offering maintenance, repair and overhaul services for aircraft from the Airbus, Boeing and Embraer fleets.

DAE Capital
DAE Capital specialises in aircraft
leasing, financing and other management services. DAE Capital services over 110 customers in 55 countries across the globe. DAE Capital is the largest
aircraft leasing firm in the Middle East. DAE
Capital has an owned, managed, committed and mandated to manage fleet of approximately 425 Airbus, ATR and Boeing aircraft with a fleet value exceeding US$16 billion, which
are leased to various airlines around the world.

In August 2017, DAE completed the acquisition of Dublin-based AWAS, propelling DAE into the top tier of global aircraft lessors.

References

Companies based in Dubai
Aerospace companies of the United Arab Emirates
2006 establishments in the United Arab Emirates
Aircraft leasing companies